Talsana is a village in Gujarat, western India.

History
It was a petty princely state, comprising six more villages, in the Jhalawar prant of Eastern Kathiawar, ruled by Jhala Rajput Chieftains.

It had a combined population of 1,691 in 1901, yielding a state revenue of 10,500 Rupees (1903-4, nearly all from land) and paying a tribute of 1,052 Rupees, to the British and Junagadh State.

See also
 Tiku Talsania, Indian actor, originally from Talsana

External links
 Imperial Gazetteer, on dsal.uchicago.edu

Princely states of Gujarat
Rajput princely states